Catherine Steiner-Adair is a clinical psychologist, school consultant, author, and teacher whose professional life is devoted to working with children, parents, and schools.

Education 
Catherine Steiner-Adair graduated from Scarsdale High School, then went on to earn her Bachelor of Arts from Bowdoin College in 1976. She was also an exchange at Williams College from 1974 to 1975. After Bowdoin, she went on to earn her doctorate in Clinical and Consulting Psychology from the Harvard Graduate School of Education in 1984. During her time at the Harvard Graduate School of Education, she studied girls' physiological development as well as education with Carol Gilligan.

Career 
Her clinical work and research are focused on girls' development and understanding, treating, and preventing eating disorders, and is internationally recognized. She has worked in the fields of education and psychology for over twenty-five years, including working throughout Israel. She has also been a consultant for over 250 independent and public schools, working with directors, faculty, parents, and students. Her areas of expertise also include boys' development, the impact of culture on gender identity, social relationships, character development, and leadership training, school practices, and parenting strategies. Dr. Steiner-Adair is an Associate Psychologist at McLean Hospital and a Clinical Instructor in the Department of Psychiatry at Harvard Medical School.

Private practice 
She has a private psychotherapy practice in Cambridge, Massachusetts where she works with adolescents, adults, couples, and families.

References

External links
Jewish Women and the Feminist Revolution from the Jewish Women's Archive

McLean Hospital people
American women psychologists
21st-century American psychologists
Harvard Medical School faculty
Bowdoin College alumni
1954 births
Living people
American women academics
21st-century American women
Harvard Graduate School of Education alumni
20th-century American psychologists